Gymnopleurus koenigi, is a species of dung beetle found in India, Sri Lanka, Mongolia, and Tibet.

Description
This broadly oval, medium convex species has an average length of about 7 to 11.5 mm. Body blackish with white or pale yellow setae on dorsum. This setae also forms a unique pattern upon the elytra. Head densely granular, with a smooth, elevated median line. Clypeus deeply notched in the middle and forms a fairly sharp single lobe on each side. Pronotum densely rugosely punctured. Elytra very deeply sulcate. Abdominal sides are rounded.

References 

Scarabaeinae
Insects of Sri Lanka
Insects of India
Insects described in 1775